In the run up to the 2015 Spanish general election, various organisations carried out opinion polling to gauge the opinions that voters hold towards political leaders. Results of such polls are displayed in this article. The date range for these opinion polls is from the previous general election, held on 20 November 2011, to the day the next election was held, on 20 December 2015.

Preferred Prime Minister
The table below lists opinion polling on leader preferences to become Prime Minister.

All candidates

Rajoy vs. Rubalcaba

Predicted Prime Minister
The table below lists opinion polling on the perceived likelihood for each leader to become Prime Minister.

References